The VIII is the eighth studio album by American singer Avant. It was released by Mo-B Entertainment, Caroline Records, and Universal Music on September 25, 2015 in the United States.

Critical reception

Andy Kellman from Allmusic rated The VIII three stars out of five. He found that "though this is as sonically consistent as any previous Avant album – mostly silky, with a little grit here and there – the subject matter fluctuates in the extreme [...] Longtime fans nonetheless should have little trouble quickly identifying a handful of cuts that rate with the past highlights."

Track listing

Notes
 denotes co-producer

Charts

References

2015 albums
Avant albums